Diego Alexander Gómez Amarilla (born 27 March 2003) is a Paraguayan professional footballer who plays as a midfielder for Club Libertad and the Paraguay national football team.

Career
Gómez made his senior debut on 4 May 2022 against Caracas FC in the Copa Libertadores. Shortly after he made his league debut for Libertad against Club Olimpia, where unfortunately he was sent-off. Despite this, he became a regular in the centre of midfield for Libertad by June 2022. In August 2022 he scored his first senior league goals, scoring twice against Club 12 de Octubre SD. Gómez was awarded the best under-19 player award by Paraguayan news organisation Versus in 2022.

International career
On 31 August 2022, Gómez made his debut for the Paraguay senior team against Mexico. He played as the Paraguay under-20 team secured victory at the 2022 South American Games in October 2022.

References

2003 births
Living people
People from Misiones Department
Paraguayan footballers
Association football midfielders
Paraguayan Primera División players
Club Libertad footballers